Peach latent mosaic viroid is a species of the genus Pelamoviroid, which belongs to the family Avsunviroidae. This family is characterized as having chloroplastic viroids with hammerhead ribozymes. Peach latent mosaic viroid is a 336-351nt circular RNA which has a branched formation. This branched formation is stabilised by a pseudoknot between two kissing loops. Peach latent mosaic viroid was first described in the 1980s in Spain by a group of scientists.

It is present in all peach- and nectarine-producing areas of the world including Europe, Asia, North America and South America and the frequency of naturally occurring infection is high.

Before the development of symptoms the disease is latent in peach trees for approximately 5–7 years. The symptoms of the disease include necrosis of buds, delayed shoot development, necrotic branches, premature ageing of trees, flower streaking, ripening deformations, enlarged rounded stones, circular discoloured areas on the fruit skin and in some cases mosaic, blotch, vein banding or calico appearance on infected leaves. Peach latent mosaic viroid is horizontally spread from plant to plant across a field by propagation of infected buds, pruning tools and green peach aphids. Vertical transmission of peach latent mosaic viroid through seeds can not occur.

References

External links
 ICTV Online (10th) Report; Avsunviroidae

Viroids
Viral plant pathogens and diseases
Stone fruit tree diseases